Henock is a masculine given name of various origins that is related to the biblical name Enoch. Notable people with the name include:

Henock Abrahamsson (1909–1958), Swedish football goalkeeper
Henock Kankoshi (born 1965), member of the Namibian National Council
Henock Trouillot (1923–1988), Haitian historian, playwright, and novelist
Henock “HK” Sileshi (1994-present), creative director of Brockhampton (band)

See also
Henok, similar and related name

Masculine given names